The teams competing in Group 7 of the 2013 UEFA European Under-21 Championship qualifying competition were Hungary, Italy, Liechtenstein, Republic of Ireland, and Turkey.

Standings

Results and fixtures

Goalscorers
6 goals
 Manolo Gabbiadini

4 goals
 Robbie Brady

3 goals

 Stephan El Shaarawy
 Mattia Destro
 James Collins

2 goals

 Gergő Beliczky
 Márkó Futács
 András Gosztonyi
 Giuseppe De Luca
 Ciro Immobile
 Lorenzo Insigne
 Niklas Kieber
 Aaron Doran
 Şahin Aygüneş

1 goal

 Balázs Balogh
 Attila Fiola
 Bence Iszlai
 Dávid Kálnoki-Kis
 István Kovács
 Fabio Borini
 Luca Caldirola
 Alessandro Florenzi
 Alberto Paloschi
 Fausto Rossi
 Jacopo Sala
 Riccardo Saponara
 Federico Viviani
 Fabian Eberle
 Simon Pirker
 Greg Cunningham
 Shane Duffy
 Conor Henderson
 Rhys Murphy
 Sean Murray
 Aidan White
 Serdar Aziz
 Özgür Çek
 Emre Çolak
 Muhammet Demir
 Burak Kaplan
 Ali Kuçik
 Oğuzhan Özyakup
 Alper Potuk
 Alper Uludağ
 Savaş Yılmaz

1 own goal
 Zsolt Szokol (playing against Turkey)
 Shane Duffy (playing against Italy)

References

External links
Standings and fixtures at UEFA.com

Group 7